John Troney (fl. 1396–1402) was an English politician.

He was Mayor of Hereford in 1396–1398 and elected a Member (MP) of the Parliament of England for Hereford in 1402.

References

14th-century births
15th-century deaths
English MPs 1402
Mayors of Hereford